Lake Buchanan is a flat salt lake at Pentland in North Queensland, Australia.  It is approximately 28 km long and 8 km wide at its widest point, with a surface area of about 117 km2. It is part of the Thomson River catchment and part of the Desert Uplands bioregion.

Lake Buchanan is different from all other salt lakes in Australia because it occurs at a high elevation - on the Great Dividing Range. The lake is shallow and the water tends to be brackish. The land around the lake is used for grazing.

Lake Buchanan contains a number of significant species which are newly discovered and most probably endemic. These include the Lake Buchanan button grass, fringing rush, Lake Buchanan fringe rush, Lawrenica buchananensis (Malvaceae), and Buchanan's fairy shrimp. The Lake Buchanan blue bush is a threatened species belonging to the genus Chenopodium.

See also

Lake Galilee
List of lakes of Australia

References

Lakes of Queensland
Saline lakes of Australia
North Queensland